Mikhail Yuryevich Alfimov (born 19 August 1987) is a Russian professional football player.

Club career
He made his Russian Football National League debut for FC Dynamo Saint Petersburg on 12 June 2010 in a game against FC Irtysh Omsk.

External links
 

1987 births
People from Yelets
Living people
Russian footballers
Association football goalkeepers
FC Metallurg Lipetsk players
FC Dynamo Saint Petersburg players
Sportspeople from Lipetsk Oblast